The following is a list of flags used by the various religious communities that inhabit the country of Vietnam.

Five-color and festival flags 

List of Vietnamese five-colour, or festival flags, those that incorporate imagery of other religions are listed at their specific sections.

Family name flags  

The family flag (Cờ họ tộc) is considered one of the most sacred symbols of a family, symbolising the spirit, will, affection and strength of the family's unity. Family flags are typically hung in front of or inside of space near roads, at temples, family mausoleums, and on the occasions of death, an anniversary, and the Tết Nguyên Đán holiday. Most of the family flags are designed based on the structural principles of the traditional five-colour flag, with the square in the same red colour, and in its centre the family name (surname) is typically written in Chinese script in the colour yellow. The most common style of writing the family name is in Khải thư, but in cases when the character is featured on both sides of the flag the observe side typically features Khải thư while the reverse side typically features Chữ Triện. Not all family flags maintain the five-colour scheme of traditional flags as some only feature 4 colours.

Taoist flags

Five elements flags

Taoist temple flags

Buddhist flags

Đạo Hòa Hảo 

Followers of Hòa Hảo denomination of Buddhism use a plain brown (maroon) flag. The colour of which is of particular importance to the community, because the altars are made by placing a similar brown cloth on the wall to mark the point faced during the prayers as well as the habits of the Hòa Hảo clergy being also brown in colour. In Vietnam, the Hòa Hảo religious flag is usually accompanied with the national Vietnamese flag. Among the Vietnamese diaspora, Hòa Hảo religious flag is typically used together with the pre-1975 flag of South Vietnam and the flag of the United States.

Christian flags

Catholic flags 

Vietnamese Catholics have adopted localised symbols such as five-colour flags combined with Christian symbolism.

Other flags

Islamic flags 

At mosques special Islamic flags are flown alongside the national Vietnamese flag. These Muslim flags are typically green in colour with a white crescent and star and is usually hoisted. Generally the shape of charges is the same as the flags that used to decorate the walls of the mosques and they also adorn the peaks of mosque's domes. While generally speaking their colours tend to be green, the star sometimes depicted as gold, which Tomislav Todorović claims is "undoubtedly borrowed from the national [Vietnamese] flag".

Caodaism flags

Notes

References

External link

Lists and galleries of flags
Religious
Flags